Harry Joseph LaFleur (March 29, 1898 – May 11, 1943) was an American football guard, fullback, center, and halfback for the Chicago Bears of the National Football League (NFL). He played at the collegiate level at Marquette University and St. Norbert College.

Biography
LaFleur was born on March 29, 1898 in Cornell, Michigan and died on May 11, 1943 in Escanaba, Michigan. He was 45 years old.

See also
 List of Chicago Bears players

References

1898 births
1943 deaths
Chicago Bears players
Marquette Golden Avalanche football players
St. Norbert Green Knights football players